Tahrui (also Romanized as Ţāhrū’ī and Ţāherū’ī; also known as Ţāherānī, Ţāherū, Tarū, and Turu) is a village in Sirik Rural District, Byaban District, Minab County, Hormozgan Province, Iran. At the 2006 census, its population was 442, in 65 families.

References 

Populated places in Minab County